Syracuse Lake is a natural lake bordering Syracuse in Kosciusko County, Indiana, United States.

Location 
Syracuse Lake is bordered on the west by N. Front Street, Pickwick Road and the B&O Railroad on the south. On the east it is bordered by E. Shore Drive and on the north by E. Northshore Drive. It connects to Lake Wawasee by a channel on the south end.

Hydrology 
Syracuse Lake is classified as a Trophic Class 1 lake, having a eutrophication index value of 10.

The lake is typical in structure of natural lakes of the glaciated portions of the upper Midwest. The lake is presently healthy and has a balanced aquatic ecosystem (WAW 1995).

History

Pre-glaciation 

Around 1 million years ago, just prior to the Pleistocene epoch, northern Indiana was covered by the Teays River system, which flowed northwest out of Virginia, West Virginia, and Ohio, entering Indiana at Adams County and flowing about 49 miles south of what is now Syracuse Lake.

Post-glaciation 
After the last glaciation period, the land was left with kettle holes and hilly moraines. The land supported large vast Picea evergreen forests and balsam poplar, which gave way to hardwoods of oak and hickory. Animal life included Glyptodon, saber-toothed cat, mastodon, short-faced bear, dire wolf, ground sloth, giant beaver, peccary, stag-moose and ancient bison. Lakes would have sturgeon, whitefish, pike, pickerel, and muskellunge.

Human inhabitation 
The ground around Syracuse Lake and Syracuse was first settled by the people of the Glacial Kame culture, who would leave behind artifacts and burial sites.

The Syracuse dugout 
He saw beneath the water what he thought was a large, water-soaked log, with one end protruding from the green algae moss. Age and exposure had rotted away most of the boat's sides. It was thought that the canoe belonged to Miami Indians or fur traders, or by very early settlers, and that it was abandoned on the old shore before the lake was raised by a dam built in 1834.

Indian Hill 
Indian Hill is located on the north shore of Syracuse Lake, 1.5 miles to the east of the town of Syracuse. It was a cemetery for the Indians of the area, who interred their dead in trees. Eventually the wrapping around the dead would disintegrate, causing the skeletal remains to fall to the ground.

Accounts of sturgeon
In 1912, Bing Raymond caught a  sturgeon in Lake Syracuse off the lake's extreme northwest side, near a place called China. Another sturgeon was seen about the same year by four men.

Current population 
Syracuse, like its neighbor, Lake Wawasee, is lined with many homes used seasonally and by those who live there year-round.

References
1995 Wawasee Area Watershed Lake Enhancement Diagnostic/Feasibility Study
Lilly, Eli. Early Wawasee Days. Indianapolis: Studio Press Inc., 1960.

Lakes of Indiana
Lakes of Kosciusko County, Indiana